Hayden James is an Australian DJ, songwriter and record producer from Sydney. He is signed to the Future Classic label.

Personal life

Hayden James is married to Sydney artist Jennifer Lia. James became a father in 2020.

Career

2013–2018: Hayden James

James released his first single "Permission to Love" in June 2013 with remixes from label mates Touch Sensitive and Charles Murdoch.

His debut EP, Hayden James was released on 30 August 2013. Since then, James has supported Disclosure and Odesza on their US and Australian tours. He has also played at major Australian music festivals Splendour in the Grass and Groovin The Moo.

His single "Something About You" was released in December 2014 and was certified gold in Australia and has been streamed over 68 million times.

In June 2016, James released "Just a Lover" which received an ARIA nomination for Best Dance Release and was followed by a national tour with producer Dena Amy as a support.

In 2016–2017, James toured across Europe and North America and co-wrote a number of tracks for Katy Perry's Witness album, as well as working on his own debut studio album. "Numb" featuring Graace was released in October 2017.

2019–present: Between Us and Lifted

In May 2019, James announced he would release his debut studio album Between Us on 14 June 2019.

James released his second studio album, Lifted, on 8 April 2022.

Discography

Studio albums

Compilation albums

Extended plays

Singles

Notes

Awards and nominations

AIR Awards
The Australian Independent Record Awards (commonly known informally as AIR Awards) is an annual awards night to recognise, promote and celebrate the success of Australia's Independent Music sector.

|-
| AIR Awards of 2015
| "Something About You" 
| Best Independent Dance/Electronic Club Song or EP
| 
|-

APRA Awards
The APRA Awards are held in Australia and New Zealand by the Australasian Performing Right Association to recognise songwriting skills, sales and airplay performance by its members annually. James has won an award from one nominations.

|-
| 2020
| "Better Together" (James with Matthew Kopp, Jack Glass and Cassian Stewart-Kasimba)
| Most Performed Dance Work of the Year
| 
|-

ARIA Music Awards

The ARIA Music Awards are a set of annual awards ceremonies, which recognises excellence, innovation, and achievement across all genres of Australian music. James has received three nominations.

|-
| 2015
| "Something About You"
| rowspan="2"| Best Dance Release
| 
|-
| 2016
| "Just a Lover"
| 
|-
| 2019
| Between Us
| Best Male Artist
| 
|-

J Award
The J Awards are an annual series of Australian music awards that were established by the Australian Broadcasting Corporation's youth-focused radio station Triple J. They commenced in 2005.

|-
| J Awards of 2019
| Between Us
| Australian Album of the Year
| 
|-

MTV Europe Music Awards
The MTV Europe Music Awards is an award presented by Viacom International Media Networks to honour artists and music in pop culture.

|-
| 2020
| Himself
| Best Australian Act
| 
|-

Queensland Music Awards
The Queensland Music Awards (previously known as Q Song Awards) are annual awards celebrating Queensland, Australia's brightest emerging artists and established legends. They commenced in 2006.

 (wins only)
! 
|-
! scope="row" rowspan="2"| 2022
| rowspan="2"| "Foolproof" (with Nat Dunn and Gorgon City)
| Electronic / Dance Award of the Year
| 
|rowspan="2"| 
|-
| Regional / Remote Award
| 
|}

References

Year of birth missing (living people)
21st-century Australian musicians
Living people
Musicians from Sydney
Australian electronic musicians
Australian DJs
Electronic dance music DJs